Mount Atago is a very common name for peaks all over Japan.

 is a 924m mountain in the northwestern part of Ukyo-ku, in the city of Kyoto, Kyoto Prefecture, Japan.  The Atago Shrine is located on the top of the mountain.


Gallery

See also

Atago class destroyer

References
 Geographical Survey Institute

External links

Atago
Shugendō